Al-Haj Mohamed Haniffa Mohamed Naina Marikkar (born 9 May 1917) was a Sri Lanan lawyer and politician. He served as the Minister of Finance (1988-1989) and Deputy Minister of Finance (1978-1988) in the Jayewardene cabinet. 

He qualified as an Advocate, he worked as a Crown Counsel in the Attorney-General's Department. He was first elected to the Parliament of Sri Lanka as member for Puttalam, representing the United National Party in the March 1960 parliamentary election, he was re-elected in the July 1960 parliamentary election, 1965 parliamentary election and was appointed Parliamentary Secretary to the Minister of Justice. He lost his seat in the 1970 parliamentary election and was re-elected in the 1970 parliamentary election.

References

20th-century Sri Lankan lawyers
Ceylonese advocates
Finance ministers of Sri Lanka
Deputy ministers of Sri Lanka
Parliamentary secretaries of Ceylon
Members of the 4th Parliament of Ceylon
Members of the 5th Parliament of Ceylon
Members of the 6th Parliament of Ceylon
Members of the 8th Parliament of Sri Lanka
United National Party politicians
1917 births

Date of death missing
Year of death missing